Ligurian or Genoese (locally called  or ) is a Gallo-Italic language spoken primarily in the territories of the former Republic of Genoa, now comprising the area of Liguria in Northern Italy, parts of the Mediterranean coastal zone of France, Monaco (where it is called Monegasque), the village of Bonifacio in Corsica, and in the villages of Carloforte on San Pietro Island and Calasetta on Sant'Antioco Island off the coast of southwestern Sardinia. It is part of the Gallo-Italic and Western Romance dialect continuum. Although part of Gallo-Italic, it exhibits several features of the Italo-Romance group of central and southern Italy. Zeneize (literally "for Genoese"), spoken in Genoa, the capital of Liguria, is the language's prestige dialect on which the standard is based.

There is a long literary tradition of Ligurian poets and writers that goes from the 13th century to the present, such as Luchetto (the Genoese Anonym), Martin Piaggio, and Gian Giacomo Cavalli.

Geographic extent and status 
Ligurian does not have an official status in Italy.  Hence, it is not protected by law. Historically, Genoese (the dialect spoken in the city of Genoa) is the written koiné, owing to its semi-official role as language of the Republic of Genoa, its traditional importance in trade and commerce, and its vast literature.

Like other regional languages in Italy, the use of Ligurian and its dialects is in rapid decline. ISTAT (the Italian Central Service of Statistics) claims that in 2012, only 9% of the population used a language other than standard Italian with friends and family, which decreases to 1.8% with strangers. Furthermore, according to ISTAT, regional languages are more commonly spoken by uneducated people and the elderly, mostly in rural areas. Liguria is no exception. One can reasonably suppose the age pyramid to be strongly biased toward the elderly who were born before World War II, with proficiency rapidly approaching zero for newer generations. Compared to other regional languages of Italy, Ligurian has experienced a significantly smaller decline which could have been a consequence of its status or the early decline it underwent in the past. The language itself is actively preserved by various groups.

Because of the importance of Genoese trade, Ligurian was once spoken well beyond the borders of the modern province. It has since given way to standard varieties, such as Standard Italian  and French. In particular, the language is traditionally spoken in coastal, northern Tuscany, southern Piedmont (part of the province of Alessandria, around the area of Novi Ligure, and the Province of Cuneo, in the municipalities of Ormea, Garessio, Alto and Caprauna), western extremes of Emilia-Romagna (some areas in the province of Piacenza), and in Carloforte on San Pietro Island and Calasetta on Sant'Antioco Island off of southwestern Sardinia (known as Tabarchino), where its use is ubiquitous and increasing. It is also spoken in the department of the Alpes-Maritimes of France (mostly the Côte d'Azur from the Italian border to and including Monaco), in the town of Bonifacio at the southern tip of the French island of Corsica, and by a large community in Gibraltar (UK). It has been adopted formally in Monaco under the name Monégasque – locally,  – but without the status of official language (that is French). Monaco is the only place where a variety of Ligurian is taught in school.

The Mentonasc dialect, spoken in the East of the County of Nice, is considered to be a transitional Occitan dialect to Ligurian; conversely, Roiasc and Pignasc spoken further North in the Eastern margin of the County are Ligurian dialects with Occitan influences.

Description 

As a Gallo-Italic language, Ligurian is most closely related to the Lombard, Piedmontese and Emilian-Romagnol languages, all of which are spoken in neighboring provinces. Unlike the aforementioned languages, however, it exhibits distinct Italian features. No link has been demonstrated by linguistic evidence between Romance Ligurian and the Ligurian language of the ancient Ligurian populations, in the form of a substrate or otherwise. Only the toponyms are known to have survived from ancient Ligurian, the name Liguria itself being the most obvious example.

Variants
Most important variants of the Ligurian language are:
Bonifacino (in Bonifacio, Corsica)
Brigasc (in La Brigue and Briga Alta)
Figùn (in Provence)
Genoese (main Ligurian variant, spoken in Genoa)
Genoese of Gibraltar (in Gibraltar)
Genoese of Nêuva Tabarca (in Spain)
Genoese pörtoriàn (in Genoa)
Intemelio (in Sanremo and Ventimiglia)
Monégasque (in Monaco)
Novéize or Oltregiogo Ligurian (North of Genoa, mainly in Val Borbera and Novi Ligure)
Royasc (in Upper Roya Valley, between Italy and France)
Spezzino (in La Spezia)
Tabarchino (in Calasetta and Carloforte, Sardinia)
Tendasc (in Tende)

Phonology

Consonants 

Vowels 

Diphthong sounds include ei  and òu .

Alphabet 

No universally accepted orthography exists for Ligurian. Genoese, the prestige dialect, has two main orthographic standards.

The other, proposed by the cultural association  and the Academia Ligustica do Brenno is the self-styled  (official orthography). The two orthographies mainly differ in their usage of diacritics and doubled consonants.

The ligature  indicates the sound , as in çit(t)æ 'city' .

There are five diacritics, whose precise usage varies between orthographies. They are:
It is also used to mark the long vowel  , in any position.

The multigraphs are:
 , used for the sound  as in bòcs 'box' .

Vocabulary 
Some basic vocabulary, in the spelling of the Genoese Academia Ligustica do Brenno:

References

Further reading 

 
 

Werner Forner, "Le mentonnais entre toutes les chaises ? Regards comparatifs sur quelques mécanismes morphologiques" [Caserio & al. 2001: 11–23]
Intemelion (revue), No. 1, Sanremo, 1995.

External links 

Associazione O Castello (in Italian and Ligurian)
Académia Ligùstica do Brénno (in Ligurian)
"Official Orthography and Alphabet" proposed by the Académia Ligùstica do Brénno (in Ligurian)
A Compagna 
GENOVÉS.com.ar (English version) – Ligurian language & culture, literature, photos and resources to learn Ligurian 
GENOVÉS.com.ar (Homepage in Ligurian and Spanish) 
Ligurian poetry and prose
Ligurian dictionaries in Spanish and English to download for free
Ligurian basic lexicon at the Global Lexicostatistical Database
The Firefox browser in Ligurian
The Opera browser in Ligurian

Ligurian language (Romance)
Gallo-Italic languages
Languages of Italy
Languages of Liguria
Languages of Piedmont
Languages of Lombardy
Languages of Emilia-Romagna
Languages of Sardinia
Languages of Monaco
Languages of France
Languages of Argentina